The Rajneesh movement are people inspired by the Indian mystic Bhagwan Shree Rajneesh (1931–1990), also known as Osho, particularly initiated disciples who are referred to as "neo-sannyasins". They used to be known as Rajneeshees or "Orange People" because of the orange and later red, maroon and pink clothes they used from 1970 until 1985. Members of the movement are sometimes called Oshoites in the Indian press.

The movement was controversial in the 1970s and 1980s, due to the founder's hostility, first to Hindu morality in India, and later to Christian morality in the United States. In the Soviet Union, the movement was banned as being contrary to "positive aspects of Indian culture and to the aims of the youth protest movement in Western countries". The positive aspects were allegedly being subverted by Rajneesh, whom the Soviet Government considered a reactionary ideologue of the monopolistic bourgeoisie of India and a promoter of consumerism in a traditional Hindu guise.

In Oregon, the movement's large intentional community of the early 1980s, called Rajneeshpuram, caused immediate tensions in the local community for its attempts to take over the nearby town of Antelope and later the county seat of The Dalles.

At the peak of these tensions, a circle of leading members of the Rajneeshpuram Oregon commune was arrested for crimes including an attempted assassination plot to murder U.S. Attorney Charles H. Turner as part of the United States's first recorded bio-terror attack calculated to influence the outcome of a local election in their favour; the effort ultimately failed. Salmonella bacteria was deployed to infect salad products in local restaurants and shops, which poisoned several hundred people. The Bhagwan, as Rajneesh was then called, was deported from the United States in 1985 as part of his Alford plea deal following the convictions of his staff and right hand Ma Anand Sheela, who were found guilty of the attack. After his deportation, 21 countries denied him entry. The movement's headquarters eventually returned to Poona (present-day Pune), India. The Oregon commune was destroyed in September 1985.

The movement in India gradually received a more positive response from the surrounding society, especially after the founder's death in 1990. The Osho International Foundation (OIF) (previously Rajneesh International Foundation [RIF]), is managed by an "Inner Circle" set up by Rajneesh before his death. They jointly administer Rajneesh's estate and operate the Osho International Meditation Resort in Pune.

In the late 1990s, rival factions challenged OIF's copyright holdings over Rajneesh's works and the validity of its royalty claims on publishing or reprinting of materials. In the United States, following a 10-year legal battle with Osho Friends International (OFI), the OFI lost its exclusive rights over the trademark OSHO in January 2009.

There are a number of smaller centres of the movement in India and around the world, including the United States, United Kingdom, Germany, Italy, and the Netherlands.

History

Prehistory 

Rajneesh began speaking in public in 1958, while still a lecturer (later professor) in philosophy at Jabalpur University. He lectured throughout India during the 1960s, promoting meditation and the ideals of free love, a social movement based on a civil libertarian philosophy that rejects state regulation and religious interference in personal relationships; he also denounced marriage as a form of social bondage, especially for women. He criticised socialism and Gandhi, but championed capitalism, science, technology and birth control, warning against overpopulation and criticising religious teachings that promote poverty and subjection.

He became known as Acharya Rajneesh, Acharya meaning "teacher or professor" and "Rajneesh" being a childhood nickname (from Sanskrit रजनि rajani, night and ईश isha, lord). By 1964, a group of wealthy backers had initiated an educational trust to support Rajneesh and aid in the running of meditation retreats. The association formed at this time was known as Jivan Jagruti Andolan (Hindi: Life Awakening Movement). As Goldman expresses it, his rapidly growing clientele suggested "that he was an unusually talented spiritual therapist". Around this time he "acquired a business manager" from the upper echelons of Indian society, Laxmi Thakarsi Kuruwa, a politically well-connected woman who would function as his personal secretary and organisational chief. She became Rajneesh's first sannyasin, taking the name Ma Yoga Laxmi. Laxmi, the daughter of a key supporter of the Nationalist Congress Party, with close ties to Gandhi, Nehru and Morarji Desai, retained this role for almost 15 years.

Beginnings 

University of Jabalpur officials forced Rajneesh to resign in 1966. He developed his role as a spiritual teacher, supporting himself through lectures, meditation camps and individual meetings (Darśana or Darshan—meaning "sight") for his wealthier followers. In 1971 he initiated six sannyasins, the emergence of the Neo-Sannyas International Movement. Rajneesh differentiated his sannyas from the traditional practice, admitting women and viewing renunciation as a process of renouncing ego rather than the world. Disciples still adopted the traditional mala, and ochre robe, and change of name. At this time, Rajneesh adopted the title "Bhagwan Shree Rajneesh".

By 1972, he had initiated 3,800 sannyasins in India. The total for the rest of the world at that time was 134, including 56 from the United States, 16 each from Britain and Germany, 12 each from Italy and the Philippines, 8 in Canada, 4 in Kenya, 2 in Denmark and 1 each from France, the Netherlands, Australia, Greece, Sweden, Norway and Switzerland. After a house was purchased for Rajneesh in Poona in 1974, he founded an ashram, and membership of the movement grew. More seekers began to visit from western nations, including therapists from the Human Potential Movement. They began to run group therapy at the ashram.

Rajneesh became the first Eastern guru to embrace modern psychotherapy. He discoursed daily upon religious scriptures, combining elements of Western philosophy, jokes and personal anecdotes. He commented on Hinduism, Zen and other religious sources, and Western psychotherapeutic approaches.

Swami Prem Amitabh (Robert Birnbaum), one of the therapists in the Poona ashram, estimates that there were about 100,000 sannyasins by 1979. Bob Mullan, a sociologist from the University of East Anglia, states that "at any one time there were about 6,000 Rajneeshees in Poona, some visiting for weeks or months to do groups or meditations, with about two thousand working and living on a permanent basis in and around the ashram." Lewis F. Carter, a sociologist from the Washington State University, estimates that 2,000 sannyasins resided at Rajneeshpuram at its height.

1984 bio-terror attack and subsequent decline 

Several incidents that led to a decline of the movement occurred in The Dalles, the county seat and largest city of Wasco County, Oregon.

In 1984, Rajneeshee teams engaged in a bio-terror attack, poisoning salad products with salmonella at local restaurants and shops, poisoning 751 people. The motivation behind the attack was to rig the local election allowing the Rajneeshees to gain political power in the city and county.

The Rajneesh were also discovered to have been running what was called "the longest wiretapping operation ever uncovered".

These revelations brought criminal charges against several Rajneesh leaders, including Ma Anand Sheela, personal secretary to Rajneesh, who pleaded guilty to charges of attempted murder and assault.

The convictions would eventually lead to the deportation of the leader of the movement, Rajneesh, along with a 10-year suspended sentence and $400,000 fine, in 1985. Urban has commented that the most surprising feature of the Osho phenomenon lies in Rajneesh's "remarkable apotheosis upon his return to India", which resulted in his achieving even more success in his homeland than before. According to Urban, Rajneesh's followers had succeeded in portraying him as a martyr, promoting the view that the Ranch "was crushed from within by the Attorney General's office ... like the marines in Lebanon, the Ranch was hit by hardball opposition and driven out."

A long drawn out fight with land use non-profit organisation 1000 Friends of Oregon also hurt the organisation. This took the form of both organisations pursuing legal interventions against each other. 1000 Friends objected to Rajneesh proposed building plans. The fight lasted for several years and attracted the attention of the media.

In 1990, Rajneesh died and was cremated at the ashram in Poona; which became the Osho International Meditation Resort. Identifying as the Esalen of the East, the resort has classes in a variety of spiritual techniques from a broad range of traditions and markets the facility as a spiritual oasis, a "sacred space" for discovering one's self, and uniting the desires of body and mind in a beautiful environment. According to press reports, it attracts some 200,000 people from all over the world each year; prominent visitors have included politicians, media personalities and the Dalai Lama.

The movement continued after Rajneesh's death. The Osho International Foundation (OIF), the successor to the Neo-Sannyas International Foundation, now propagates his views, operating once more out of the Pune ashram in India. The organization ran a pre-web, global computer network called "OSHONET". The movement has begun to communicate on the Internet. Current leaders downplay early controversies in Oregon in an effort to appeal to a wider audience.

After Rajneesh's death, various disagreements ensued concerning his wishes and his legacy. This led to the formation of a number of rival collectives. One of the central disagreements related to OIF's copyright control over his works. One group, Osho Friends International, spent 10 years challenging the OIF's use of the title OSHO as an exclusive trademark.

In 2003, sociologist Stephen Hunt wrote in Alternative Religions that "the movement has declined since 1985, and some would argue it is now, for all intents and purposes, defunct."

In the United States, on 13 January 2009, the exclusive rights that OIF held over the trademark were finally lost. OIF filed a Notice of Appeal on 12 March, but eventually filed for withdrawal in the Court of Appeals on 19 June, thus cancelling the trademarks of Osho in the US.

On 16 March 2018, Netflix released a six-part documentary entitled Wild Wild Country regarding the Rajneesh movement.

Beliefs and practices

Religion 
A 1972 monograph outlined Rajneesh's concept of sannyas. It was to be a worldwide movement, rooted in the affirmation of life, playful, joyful and based on science rather than belief and dogma. It would not rely on ideology and philosophy, but on practices, techniques and methods aiming to offer every individual the chance to discover and choose their own proper religious path; the intent was to lead people to an essential, universal religiousness. The movement would be open to people of all religions or of none, experimenting with the inner methods of all religions in their pure, original form, not seeking to synthesise them but to provide facilities whereby each might be revived, maintained and defended and their lost and hidden secrets rediscovered. The movement would not seek to create any new religion.

To this end, communities would be founded around the world and groups of sannyasins would tour the world to aid seekers of spiritual enlightenment and demonstrate techniques of meditation. Other groups would perform kirtan (call and response chanting) and conduct experiments in healing. Communities would run their own businesses, and various publishing companies would be founded. A central International University of Meditation would have branches all over the world and run meditation camps, and study groups would investigate the key texts of Tantra, Taoism, Hinduism and other traditions.

In one survey conducted at Rajneeshpuram, over 70 percent of those surveyed listed their religious affiliation as "none"; however, 60 percent of sannyasins participated in activities of worship several times a month. In late 1981 Rajneesh, through his secretary Ma Anand Sheela (Sheela Silverman), announced the inception of the "religion of Rajneeshism", the basis of which would be fragments taken from various discourses and interviews that Rajneesh had given over the years. In July 1983 Rajneesh Foundation International published a 78-page book entitled Rajneeshism: An introduction to Bhagwan Shree Rajneesh and His Religion, in an attempt to systematise Rajneesh's religious teachings and institutionalise the movement. Despite this, the book claimed that Rajneeshism was not a religion, but rather "a religionless religion ... only a quality of love, silence, meditation and prayerfulness". Carter comments that the motivation for formalising Rajneesh's teachings are not easy to determine, but might perhaps have been tied to a visa application made to the Immigration and Naturalization Service to obtain "religious worker" status for him.
People followed the norms of wearing similar clothes and participating in the same activities. The people were allowed to come and go as they pleased as long as they did not hurt anybody. In the last week of September 1985, after Sheela had fled in disgrace, Rajneesh declared that the religion of "Rajneeshism" and "Rajneeshees" no longer existed, and that anything bearing the name would be dismantled.
 His disciples set fire to 5,000 copies of the book Rajneeshism. Rajneesh said he ordered the book-burning to rid the sect of the last traces of the influence of Sheela, whose robes were added to the bonfire.

Society

Intentional community 
Rajneesh held that families, large cities and nations would ultimately be replaced by small communities with a communal way of life. By 1972, small communes of disciples existed in India and Kenya, and a larger one, to be known as Anand Shila, was planned as a "permanent world headquarters" in India. However, this plan was repeatedly thwarted. Large communes were planned in the west. The Rajneesh organisation bought the  Big Muddy Ranch near Antelope, Oregon in July 1981, renaming it Rancho Rajneesh and later Rajneeshpuram. Initially, approximately 2,000 people took up residence in the intentional community, and Rajneesh moved there too. The organisation purchased a reception hotel in Portland. In July 1983 it was bombed by the radical Islamic group Jamaat ul-Fuqra, a group that had connections with militants in Pakistani-held Azad Kashmir and sought to attack "soft" targets with Indian connections in the United States.

The Rajneesh movement clashed with Oregon officials and government while at Rajneeshpuram, resulting in tensions within the commune itself. A siege mentality set in among the commune's leaders, and intimidation and authoritarianism ensued. Disillusioned followers began to leave the organisation. Commune members were instructed to cease communication with anyone who left.

Marriage and the family 
Although the movement was without clearly defined and shared values, it was well known that Rajneesh discouraged marrying and having children, since he saw families as inherently prone to dysfunction and destructiveness. Not many children were born at the communes in Oregon and England, and contraception, sterilisation, and abortion were accepted. According to Pike, some parents justified leaving their children when moving to the ashram by reasoning that spiritual development was more important.

Commerce 

Hugh B. Urban comments that "one of the most astonishing features of the early Rajneesh movement was its remarkable success as a business enterprise". It "developed an extremely effective and profitable corporate structure", and "by the 1980s, the movement had evolved into a complex, interlocking network of corporations, with an astonishing number of both spiritual and secular businesses worldwide, offering everything from yoga and psychological counselling to cleaning services." It has been estimated that at least 120 million dollars were generated during the movement's time in Oregon, a period when the acquisition of capital, the collection of donations, and legal work were a primary concern. The popular press reported widely on the large collection of Rolls-Royce cars Rajneesh had amassed, reported to be 93 at the final count. James S. Gordon reported that some sannyasins saw the cars as an unrivalled tool for obtaining publicity, others as a good business investment or as a test, others as an expression of Rajneesh's scorn for middle-class aspirations and yet others as an indication of the love of his disciples. Gordon opined that what Rajneesh loved most about the Rolls-Royces, apart from their comfort, was "the anger and envy that his possession of so many—so absurdly, unnecessarily, outrageously many—of them aroused". He wrote of a bumper sticker that was popular among sannyasins: "Jesus Saves. Moses Invests. Bhagwan Spends."

By the mid-1980s, the movement, assisted by a sophisticated legal and business infrastructure, had created a corporate machine consisting of various front companies and subsidiaries. At this time, the three main identifiable organisations within the Rajneesh movement were: the Ranch Church, or Rajneesh International Foundation (RIF); the Rajneesh Investment Corporation (RIC), through which the RFI was managed; and the Rajneesh Neo-Sannyasin International Commune (RNSIC). The umbrella organisation that oversaw all investment activities was Rajneesh Services International Ltd., a company incorporated in the UK but based in Zurich. There were also smaller organisations, such as Rajneesh Travel Corp, Rajneesh Community Holdings, and the Rajneesh Modern Car Collection Trust, whose sole purpose was to deal with the acquisition and rental of Rolls-Royces. By the early 21st century, members of the movement were running stress management seminars for corporate clients such as BMW, and the movement was reported in 2000 to be making $15–45 million annually in the U.S.

Elections

During elections the Rajneesh would bring thousands of homeless people from New York, Chicago, Los Angeles, Phoenix, and other cities to live and vote in Rajneeshpuram and Rajneesh. Representative Wayne H. Fawbush, who represented both areas, wanted a special session of the Oregon Legislature to be called to change Oregon's voter registration laws to prevent the homeless being brought by the Rajneesh from voting.

During the selection of Oregon's thirteen alternate delegates to the 1984 Republican National Convention Ma Prem Kavido, a precinct committee member from Rajneeshpuram and member of the Rajneesh city council, and Ma Prem Debal ran, but both were defeated placing 14th and 15th respectively. Four Rajneesh from Wasco and Jefferson counties were selected to serve as delegates at the Oregon Republican Party's state convention.

Demographics
One of the first surveys of sannyasins was conducted in 1980 at the Poona ashram by Swami Krishna Deva (David Berry Knapp), an American clinical psychologist who would later serve as mayor of Rajneeshpuram. In the survey, Krishna Deva polled 300 American sannyasins and discovered that their median age was just over 30. 60 percent of them had been sannyasins for less than two years, and most continued to live in the United States. Half of them came from California, 97 percent were white, 25 percent were Jewish and 85 percent belonged to the middle and upper-middle classes. Almost two-thirds had university degrees and viewed themselves as "successful in worldly terms". Three-quarters had previously been involved in some therapy and more than half had previously experimented with another spiritual group. In 1984 the average age of members of the Rajneesh movement was 34; 64 percent of the followers had a four-year college degree.

A survey of 635 Rajneeshpuram residents was conducted in 1983 by Norman D. Sundberg, director of the University of Oregon's Clinical/Community Psychology Program, and three of his colleagues. It revealed a middle-class group of predominantly college-educated whites around the age of 30, the majority of whom were women. Nearly three-quarters of those surveyed attributed their decisions to become Rajneeshees to their love for Rajneesh or his teachings. 91 percent stated that they had been looking for more meaning in their lives prior to becoming members. When asked to rate how they felt about their lives as Rajneeshees, 93 percent stated they were "extremely satisfied" or nearly so, most of them choosing the top score on a scale of 0 to 8. Only 8 percent stated that they had been as happy before joining.

Legacy 
Internationally, by 2005 (and after almost two decades of controversy and a decade of accommodation), Rajneesh's movement had established itself in the market of new religions. His followers have redefined his contributions, reframing central elements of his teaching so as to make them appear less controversial to outsiders. Societies in North America and Western Europe have met them half-way, becoming more accommodating to spiritual topics such as yoga and meditation. The Osho International Foundation (OIF) in Pune runs stress management seminars for corporate clients such as IBM and BMW, with a reported (in 2000) revenue of between $15 and $45 million annually in the US.

OSHO International Meditation Resort  has described itself as the Esalen of the East, and teaches a variety of spiritual techniques from a broad range of traditions. It promotes itself as a spiritual oasis, a "sacred space" for discovering one's self and uniting the desires of body and mind in a beautiful resort environment. According to press reports, prominent visitors have included politicians and media personalities. In 2011, a national seminar on Rajneesh's teachings was inaugurated at the Department of Philosophy of the Mankunwarbai College for Women in Jabalpur. Funded by the Bhopal office of the University Grants Commission, the seminar focused on Rajneesh's "Zorba the Buddha" teaching, seeking to reconcile spirituality with the materialist and objective approach. As of 2013, the resort required all guests to be tested for HIV/AIDS at its Welcome Center on arrival.

In July 2020, singer-songwriter Sufjan Stevens released a song themed after the movement titled "My Rajneesh".

In September 2020, the OSHO International Foundation, which owns the OSHO International Meditation Resort, decided to sell two 1.5 acre plots of land, currently housing a swimming pool and a tennis court. As a charitable trust, the OIF filed an application with the Charity Commissioner in Mumbai requesting permission for the sale. In the application, they cited financial distress due to the COVID19 pandemic. This has sparked controversy amongst Osho followers, and their representative Yogesh Thakkar was quoted saying “This place is made by Osho devotees for Osho devotees, and it belongs to Osho devotees.” Ten Osho disciples filed an objection to the sale with the Charity Commissioner.

People associated with the movement

Literature and thought 
 Joachim-Ernst Berendt, jazz musician, journalist and author. He became a member of the movement in 1983. When Rajneesh died in 1990, he wrote an obituary calling him the "master of the heart" as well as "the holiest scoundrel I ever knew".
 Elfie Donnelly, Anglo-Austrian children's book author. She joined the movement in the 1980s and was among the disciples Rajneesh appointed to the "Inner Circle", the group entrusted with administering his estate after his death.
 Jörg Andrees Elten, German writer and journalist. He was a reporter for Stern before joining the movement, and later took the name Swami Satyananda.
 Tim Guest, journalist and author. He grew up in the movement with the name Yogesh and later wrote a critical book, My Life in Orange, about his difficult childhood.
 Bernard Levin, English columnist. He joined the movement with his then girlfriend, Arianna Huffington, in the early 1980s and later published glowing accounts of Rajneesh and the movement in The Times. About Rajneesh, he stated: "He is the conduit along which the vital force of the universe flows." Levin later joined the Movement of Spiritual Inner Awareness with Huffington.
 Peter Sloterdijk, German philosopher. He joined the movement in the 1970s. In interviews given in 2006, he credited the experience with having had a fundamental, beneficial and continuing effect on his outlook on life.
 Margot Anand, a teacher of tantra. She was a student of Rajneesh and first began to teach tantra in his ashram.
 Jan Foudraine, Dutch psychiatrist, psychotherapist, writer and mystic. His sannyasin name is Swami Deva Amrito.
 Nirmala Srivastava, Indian spiritual teacher. She was an early member of the Rajneesh movement and later founded a spiritual movement of her own, Sahaja Yoga, repudiating Rajneesh.
 Ma Prem Usha, Indian tarot card reader, fortune teller and journalist. She was a member of the movement for 30 years, until her death in 2008.

Performance arts 
 Parveen Babi, Indian actress. She joined the movement in the mid-1970s together with her former boyfriend, the producer Mahesh Bhatt, and later became a devotee of philosopher U. G. Krishnamurti.
 Mahesh Bhatt, Indian film director, producer and screenwriter. He became a sannyasin in the mid-1970s, but later left the movement and instead found spiritual companionship and guidance with U. G. Krishnamurti, whose biography he wrote in 1992.
 Georg Deuter, also known as Swami Chaitanya Hari, Musician of the Rajneesh movement. He composed the music that accompanies Rajneesh's meditation recordings in Poona and later at Rajneeshpuram.
 Mike Edwards, British former member of the Electric Light Orchestra, known as Swami Deva Pramada or simply Pramada.
 Ted Gärdestad, Swami Sangit Upasani, Swedish singer and former tennis player.
 Albert Mol, Dutch actor and author.
 Nena, German singer and actress. In 2009, she stated that she had become a fan of Rajneesh, his books and meditation techniques, which she had discovered a few years earlier.
 Ramses Shaffy, Dutch singer and actor. He was once a heavy drinker, but stopped drinking when he joined the movement in the early 1980s and became Swami Ramses Shaffy. He later relapsed into alcoholism.
 Terence Stamp, British actor. In the 1970s, he spent time at the Poona ashram, meditating and studying the teachings of Rajneesh.
 Kavyen Temperley, Australian lead singer who forms part of Australian band Eskimo Joe.
 Anneke Wills (Ma Prem Anita), British actress most famous for her role as Doctor Who sidekick Polly. She moved to India to stay at the Poona ashram with her son Jasper (Swami Dhyan Yogi) during the 1970s and moved again to a sannyasin commune in California during the early 1980s.

Politics 
 Arianna Huffington, Greek-American political activist, and her then partner Bernard Levin were disciples in the early 1980s. They later joined the Movement of Spiritual Inner Awareness.
 Vinod Khanna, Indian film star and politician, was Rajneesh's gardener in Rajneeshpuram. He later became India's Minister of State for External Affairs (junior foreign minister), holding office from 2003 to 2004. He became a sannyasin on 31 December 1975 and received the name Swami Vinod Bharti.
 Barbara Rütting, German actress, author and V-Partei3 politician. Her sannyasin name is Ma Anand Taruna.

Others 
 Pratiksha Apurv, an artist, is Rajneesh's niece and has been a member of the movement since the age of 11.
 Prince Welf Ernst of Hanover, eldest son of Prince George William of Hanover and Princess Sophie of Greece and Denmark, joined the movement in 1975 and died from a ruptured cerebral haemorrhage at the age of 33, while at the Poona ashram. Rajneesh gave him the name of Swami Vimalkirti.
 Shannon Jo Ryan, daughter of former Congressman Leo Ryan, who investigated the Jonestown commune of the People's Temple in Guyana and was killed there by followers of the Temple in 1978. She joined the Rajneesh movement in 1981, took the name Ma Prem Amrita Pritam, and married another sannyasin, Peter Waight (Swami Anand Subhuti), at Rajneeshpuram in 1982.
 Ma Prem Pratiti – Lady Zara Jellicoe, daughter of Earl Jellicoe.

See also 
 1985 Rajneeshee assassination plot
 Breaking the Spell: My Life as a Rajneeshee and the Long Journey Back to Freedom
 Byron v. Rajneesh Foundation International
 Rebellious Flower

Footnotes 

 a  The Handbook of the Oneida Community claims to have coined the term around 1850, and laments that its use was appropriated by socialists to attack marriage, an institution that they felt protected women and children from abandonment.

Citations

Bibliography 

 .
 .
 
 .
 .
 .
 .
 . (Includes a 135-page section on Rajneeshpuram previously published in two parts in The New Yorker magazine, 22 September and 29 September 1986 editions).
 .
 .
 .
 .
 .
 .
 .
 .
 .
 .
 .
 
 .
 .
 .
 .
 .
 .
 .
 .
 .
 .
 .
 .
 .

Further reading 
 
 
 O'Brien, Paula (2008) The Rajneesh sannyasin community in Fremantle Master's degree thesis at Murdoch University, Western Australia

External links 

 Osho International Meditation Resort
 Moscow Osho Centre "Winds" and Osho-Commune "Bhavata"
 The Sannyas Wiki
 Neosannyas.org
 Considering Controversy and Stagnation in the Osho Rajneesh Movement
 Article The Rise and Fall of Rajneeshpuram in Ashé Journal
 Rajneeshees in Oregon: The Untold Story – Five-part series in The Oregonian newspaper, April 2011
 List of attacks attributed to the Rajneeshees on the START terrorism database

Cults
 
Hindu new religious movements
Hindu denominations
Articles containing video clips